Utku is a Turkish given name for females and (mostly) males; it means 'victory'. People named Utku include:

Given name (male) 
 Utku Dalmaz (born 1985), Turkish electronic dance music producer, jazz guitarist and web developer
 Utku Sen (born 1998), German footballer
 Utku Ünal (born 1983), Turkish musician
 Utku Yuvakuran (born 1997), Turkish football goalkeeper

 See also: Utkuhiksalik

References 

Turkish masculine given names
Turkish feminine given names